Carlson Aircraft is an American aircraft design and manufacturing company based in East Palestine, Ohio.

The company was acquired by Team Mini-Max in April 2020.

History
Ernst W. Carlson founded Carlson Aircraft to market his Carlson Sparrow ultralight aircraft designs as aircraft kits. He later added the Criquet, a 75% scale replica of the Fieseler Fi 156 Storch Second World War liaison aircraft and the Carlson Skycycle, a replica of the A. Hanford Eckman designed Piper PA-8 Skycycle of 1945. In the late 2000s Carlson sold the Sparrow line to Skyline Technologies' of Salem, Ohio, but that company no longer produces the Sparrow series. Today Carlson Aircraft produces wings, wing components and fuel tanks.

Aircraft

References

External links

Aircraft manufacturers of the United States
Replica aircraft manufacturers